is a Japanese road and track cyclist in the C3 category from Shizuoka Prefecture. She belongs to Team Bridgestone Cycling. She has also been active under the name of Yoshiko Sugiura since around 2019. Sugiura won the gold medal at the women's road time trial, at the 2020 Summer Paralympics,

Early life
Sugiura was born in Kakegawa, Shizuoka on December 26, 1970. She attended Kakegawa Nishi High School and later Kitasato University Faculty of Pharmaceutical Sciences. After graduating from college, she participated in triathlon and road racing as a hobby while working as a pharmacist and sports pharmacist.

Career
In April 2016, Sugiura was injured during a road race in Shizuoka, resulting in cerebral contusion, traumatic subarachnoid hemorrhage, crushed fracture of skull, clavicle, ribs and scapula, and injuries to the trisection canal. Although she survived, doctors told her she could not heal from her condition, she still had higher brain dysfunction. During the rehabilitation, an acquaintance recommended paracycling, and in March 2017, she returned to the Utsunomiya Criterium & Road Race.

After that, Sugiura registered as a para-cyclist. She won the gold metal in the time trial of the 2017 UCI Para-cycling Road World Championships and got a lot of attention. She also won the gold medal at 2018 UCI Para-cycling Road World Championships in the road race. She was selected as one of the winners of the UCI (Union Cycliste Internationale) annual award, the Para-Cycling Award, for her success this season, including winning the afformentioned road race. The award was her first Japanese award.

At the 2020 Summer Paralympics, Sugiura won the gold medal at the women's road time trial. She thus became the oldest Japanese person to win a Paralympic gold medal at the age of 50. She also won the women's road race, becoming the first Japanese cyclist to win two gold medals in the same Paralympics.

Personal life
Sugiura has two children. Her son, Yuma Noguchi, is also a professional road cyclist.

References 

1970 births
Living people
Japanese female cyclists
Para-cyclists
Japanese pharmacists
Japanese disabled sportspeople
Sportswomen with disabilities
Paralympic cyclists of Japan
Paralympic gold medalists for Japan
Paralympic medalists in cycling
Medalists at the 2020 Summer Paralympics
Cyclists at the 2020 Summer Paralympics
Sportspeople from Shizuoka Prefecture
People with traumatic brain injuries
20th-century Japanese women
21st-century Japanese women